Maya Channel Magazine is a Thai biweekly gossip magazine owned by Maya Channel 2002 Co., Ltd.

The magazine also presents an annual entertainment award called Maya Awards.

References

External links 
 

Biweekly magazines
Magazines published in Thailand